The 2019–20 División de Honor de Hockey Hierba was the 54th season of the División de Honor de Hockey Hierba, the highest field hockey league in Spain. The season began on 2 November 2019 and was scheduled to conclude with the second match of the championship final on 10 May 2020 in Barcelona.

Club Egara were the defending champions, while Complutense entered as the promoted team from the 2018–19 División de Honor Masculina B.

On 13 March 2020, the league was suspended for at least two weeks due to the COVID-19 pandemic in Spain. The league was officially voided on 6 May 2020 with no relegation and no champion. Atlètic Terrassa qualified for the 2021 Euro Hockey League as the highest-ranked team and Real Club de Polo qualified as the 2020 Copa del Rey winners but they later withdrew and were replaced by Club de Campo. The next season will be played with 12 teams as the best two teams from the second division are promoted and there is no relegation.

Teams

Number of teams by autonomous community

Regular season

League table

Results

Top goalscorers

References

External links
Official page

División de Honor de Hockey Hierba
Division de Honor de Hockey Hierba
field hockey
field hockey
División de Honor de Hockey Hierba